Nongda Nanlu station is a station on the Line 16 of the Beijing Subway, located southwest of the west campus of China Agricultural University. It was opened on 30 December 2017.

Station Layout 
The station has an underground island platform.

Exits 
There are 4 exits, lettered A, B, C, and D. Exit D is accessible.

References

Beijing Subway stations in Haidian District
Railway stations at university and college campuses
Railway stations in China opened in 2017